Museo de Arte Contemporáneo  (English: Museum of Contemporary Art) may refer to:

Museo de Arte Contemporáneo de Rosario, Argentina
Museo de Arte Contemporáneo (Santiago, Chile), Chile
Museo de Arte Contemporáneo Valdivia, Chile
Castillo de Montsoreau-Museo de Arte Contemporáneo, France
Museo de Arte Contemporáneo de Monterrey, Mexico
Museo de Arte Contemporáneo de Alicante, Spain
Museo de Arte Contemporáneo de Castilla y León, Spain
Museo de Arte Contemporáneo (Madrid), Spain

See also
Museo Universitario Arte Contemporáneo, Mexico City
List of contemporary art museums